The Women's Volleyball Thailand League is the highest level of Thailand club volleyball in the 2012–13 season and the 8th edition.

Teams

 Ayutthaya A.T.C.C
 Idea Khonkaen
 Nakhonnonthaburi
 Nakhon Ratchasima
 Sisaket
 Suan Sunandha
 Supreme Nakhonsi
 Samut Prakan

Ranking

|}

Results

|}

|}

|}

|}

|}

|}

Final standing

Awards

References

External links
 

2012
Volleyball,Thailand League
Volleyball,Thailand League
Thailand League
Thailand League